The House at 380 Chiltern Drive is a historic house located at 380 Chiltern Drive in the Deerpath Hill Estates development in Lake Forest, Illinois. Developer Henry K. Turnbull and architect Stanley D. Anderson, the planners of the original Deerpath Hill Estates development, built and designed the house in 1930 as part of the development's second addition. The house has a French Norman Revival design in keeping with the revivalist styles used throughout the development; its design features a stair tower, steep roofs with flared eaves, and wall dormers with casement windows. The house is the only one built and designed by Turnbull and Anderson in the second addition and was the last house built by the duo before the Great Depression bankrupted Turnbull.

The house was added to the National Register of Historic Places on May 12, 2006.

References

Houses on the National Register of Historic Places in Illinois
Houses completed in 1930
National Register of Historic Places in Lake County, Illinois
Houses in Lake County, Illinois